Halwell and Moreleigh is a civil parish in Devon, England. It comprises the villages of Halwell and Moreleigh.

History
The civil parish was formed in 1988 by the amalgamation of the former separate civil parishes of Halwell and Moreleigh.

Halwell

During the Saxon era Halwell was one of the four burhs, or fortified settlements, established in Devon by King Alfred the Great (d.899), King of Wessex from 871 to 899, to defend against invasion by Vikings.

Moreleigh
The manor of Moreleigh is  listed in the Domesday Book of 1086 as Morlei, the 16th of the 22 Devonshire holdings of Alfred the Breton, one of the Devon Domesday Book tenants-in-chief of King William the Conqueror. In the 13th century the courthouse of Stanborough Hundred was situated above the New Inn. The Church of All Saints in Moreleigh had been built by 1239.

Description
Halwell and Moreleigh comprises the villages of Halwell and Moreleigh (also spelled Morleigh), approximately ½ mile apart. The parish has approximately 650 residents.

Location
Halwell and Moreleigh is situated in the South Hams local government district in Devon, England. It lies 5 miles (8 km) south of Totnes, 6 miles (11 km) west of Dartmouth and 5 miles north of Kingsbridge.

Halwell and Moreleigh is surrounded, starting north and following the clock, by the parishes of Harberton, Ashprington, Cornworthy, Blackawton, East Allington, Woodleigh and Diptford.

Notes